Susan Mosher is an American stage and film actress. She starred as the Female Authority figure in the Vegas run of Hairspray and is best known for portraying Pepper Cole in the show Cashino. She also was in the original cast of the Broadway show SUDS. Mosher is currently performing as the Female Authority Figure in Broadway's run of Hairspray and as an understudy for Velma Von Tussle for Isabel Keating to present.

Mosher appeared in the musical revue Back to Bacharach and David in Los Angeles in April–May 2009.

External links

Year of birth missing (living people)
Living people
American film actresses
Place of birth missing (living people)
American stage actresses
21st-century American women